Griff is an American crime drama starring Lorne Greene and Ben Murphy, which aired on ABC from September 29, 1973, to January 4, 1974.

Synopsis
Lorne Greene portrayed Wade "Griff" Griffin, a former police officer who becomes a private detective. Ben Murphy plays Greene's 31-year-old partner, S. Michael "Mike" Murdock. Vic Tayback portrays Captain Barney Marcus of the Los Angeles Police Department, Griff's continuing contact with the police. Patricia Stich appeared as Gracie Newcombe, the secretary for the two detectives.

The two-hour pilot movie, titled Man on the Outside,  did not air until June 25, 1975, almost a year and a half after the cancellation of the series. Ben Murphy does not appear in the pilot, which has a plot identical to the plot of the pilot for Barnaby Jones. Wade Griffin's son is murdered, and Griff goes after the man who killed him.

The Case of the Baltimore Girls is a TV movie compiled from two episodes, "The Last Ballad" (November 10, 1973) and "All the Lonely People" (October 13, 1973), and features Kim Hunter, Patricia Crowley, Lawrence Pressman, Dabney Coleman, William Windom, and Herbert Rudley.

Death Follows a Psycho is another TV movie compiled from two episodes, "Countdown to Terror" (November 17, 1973) & "Elephant in a Cage" (November 24, 1973).

Guest stars
 Christopher Connelly
 Barbara Feldon
 Norman Fell
 Susan Howard
 Warren Stevens
 Sal Mineo 
 Ricardo Montalbán
 Nick Nolte
 Ben Piazza 
 Inga Swenson

Production notes
The series was executive produced by Steven Bochco, David Victor, Peter S. Fischer and Robert F. O'Neill.

Griff was filmed by Groverton Productions at Universal City Studios in Los Angeles. The series followed the ABC Suspense Movie at the 10 p.m. Eastern timeslot on Saturdays opposite CBS's The Carol Burnett Show and the NBC Saturday Night at the Movies.

Episodes

References

External links
 

1973 American television series debuts
1974 American television series endings
1970s American crime drama television series
American Broadcasting Company original programming
English-language television shows
Television series by Universal Television
Television series created by Larry Cohen
Television shows set in Los Angeles
American detective television series